Eric Coss (born June 12, 1963) is a former American football center who played one season for the New York Jets. He was also a top wrestler in college. He was a replacement player.

Early life
Eric Coss was born on June 12, 1963.

High School and College career

High school
He went to High School at Bethel Park (PA). In high school he was his team's captain. He led them to the 1980 WPIAL Championship game. He was also a two-time All-Conference selection. He was also a wrestler in high school. He was a two-time regional champion. He was also a letterman in track. He went to college at Temple University. He was ranked as a top-15 wrestler in his senior year.

Awards and honors

High school
Bethel Park Athletic Hall of Fame (2011)

Football
Two-Time All-Conference Selection (1980s)
Team Captain (1980s)
Big 33 Game (1980)

Wrestling
Two-Time Regional Champion (1980s)

College

Wrestling
Top-15 Ranked Wrestler (1985)

Professional career
Coss was drafted in the 1986 USFL Territorial Draft by the Baltimore Stars but he did not play for them. He also signed with the Dallas Cowboys but did not play for them either. In 1987 he played with the New York Jets as a replacement player and played in 3 games.

Later life
In 2011, he was inducted into the Bethel Park Athletic Hall of Fame. His son, Colton, played college football at Pomona College.

References

1963 births
Living people
New York Jets players
American football centers
Temple Owls football players
National Football League replacement players